Karen Ackerman (born October 10, 1951, Cincinnati, Ohio) is an American author of children's books.

Background
She was born in Cincinnati, Ohio, and she graduated from Woodward High School in 1969.

Career
Ackerman's first children's book was published in 1982.  She has since published over twenty-five books. Her books have won many awards including Parents' Choice, ABA Pick of the List, ALA Notable Books, Children's Book Council/NCSS Notable Books in the Field of Social Studies, New York Library Best List, Horn Book's Best, and School Library Journal Best Books.  

Her picture-book Song and Dance Man, illustrated by Stephen Gammell, won the 1989 Caldecott Medal. The book was adapted into a children's theater production at the Sunset Playhouse in Elm Grove, Wisconsin in 2019.

Awards 
Caldecott Medal, 1989, for the book Song and Dance Man, illustrated by Stephen Gammell, Knopf, 1988

Bibliography

Picture books
Flannery Row. New York: Atlantic Monthly (1986)
Song & Dance Man (1988)
Theo's Vineyard (1989)
Araminta's Paint Box, illustrated by Betsy Lewin. (1990)
The Banshee, illustrated by David Ray. New York: Philomel (1990)
Just Like Max, illustrated by George Schmidt. New York: Knopf (1990)
The Tin Heart (1990)
Moveable Mabeline (1990)
When Mama Retires. New York: Knopf (1992)
I Know A Place, illustrated by Deborah Kogan Ray. New York: Houghton Mifflin (1992)
This Old House. New York: Atheneum (1992)
By the Dawn's Early Light, illustrated by Catherine Stock (1994)
The Sleeping Porch, illustrated by Elizabeth Sayles. New York: Morrow (1995)
Bingleman's Midway, illustrated by Barry Moser. Honesdale: Boyds Mills Press (1995)
In the Park With Dad: A Story for Kids Whose Parents Don't Live Together illustrated by Linda Crockett-Blassingame. Boston: Pauline Books and Media (1996)
Walking With Clara Belle, illustrated by Debbie Mason. Boston: Pauline Books and Media (1996)
Bean's Big Day (2004)

Fiction
The Leaves in October (1991)
The Broken Boy. New York: Philomel (1991)
The Night Crossing (1994)

References

1951 births
Living people
American children's writers
Writers from Cincinnati
20th-century American women writers
American women children's writers
21st-century American women writers
Woodward High School (Cincinnati, Ohio) alumni